John Mark Dempsey (born 7 April 1966) is an Australian politician currently serving as Mayor of the Bundaberg Regional Council. He previously served as the Queensland Minister for Police and Community Safety in the Newman Government and was a member of the Queensland Legislative Assembly from 2006 to 2015.

Political career

Opposition
A member of the National Party, Dempsey was first elected  at the 2006 state election to the Electoral district of Bundaberg. He became a member of the Liberal National Party when the National party merged with the Liberal Party in July 2008.

While in Opposition, Dempsey served as the Shadow Parliamentary Secretary to the Shadow Minister for Police and Corrective Services from 21 September 2006 to 12 August 2008. He was a member of the Parliamentary Crime and Misconduct Committee from 11 October 2006 to 16 June 2011, and was the Shadow Minister for Child Safety and Shadow Minister for Sport from 6 April 2009 to 29 November 2010. 

Dempsey was appointed the Shadow Minister for the Environment and the Shadow Minister for Sport and Recreation from 29 November 2010 to 11 April 2011. He was appointed as Shadow Minister for Mining and Resource Management from 11 April 2011 to 19 February 2012.

Newman Government
In March 2012, the Liberal National Party won the 2012 Queensland state election. Dempsey was sworn in as Minister for Aboriginal and Torres Strait Islander and Multicultural Affairs and Minister assisting the Premier on 3 April 2012. 

On 16 April 2012 Dempsey was appointed acting Minister for Police and Community Safety following the resignation of David Gibson. He was appointed to the office in his own right on 23 April 2012, with Glen Elmes taking his place as Minister for Aboriginal and Torres Strait Islander Partnerships and Minister Assisting the Premier.

In January 2015, Dempsey was defeated in the 2015 Queensland state election by Labor candidate Leanne Donaldson. Dempsey finished with the highest primary vote, however Donaldson was declared the winner following the distribution of preferences.

Local Government
On 19 March 2016, Dempsey was elected as Mayor of Bundaberg Regional Council, winning with approximately 71% of the primary vote.

As at May 2018, Dempsey is not a member of any political party.

Federal Politics
In March 2022 Dempsey announced he would be an independent candidate for the federal lower house seat of Hinkler in the 2022 Australian federal election.

References

External links
 
 

1966 births
Living people
Members of the Queensland Legislative Assembly
National Party of Australia members of the Parliament of Queensland
Liberal National Party of Queensland politicians
People from Bundaberg
People educated at Brisbane State High School
21st-century Australian politicians
Mayors of places in Queensland